Qingcheng may refer to the following in China:

Mount Qingcheng (青城山), near Dujiangyan, Sichuan, one of the most important centres of Taoism in China
Qingcheng County (庆城县), of Qingyang, Gansu
Qingcheng District (清城区), Qingyuan, Guangdong
Qingcheng Park (青城公园), in Hohhot, Inner Mongolia

Towns
Qingcheng, Qingcheng County (庆城镇), seat of Qingcheng County, Gansu
Written as "青城镇":
Qingcheng, Yuzhong County, in Yuzhong County, Gansu
Qingcheng, Gaoqing County, in Gaoqing County, Shandong
Qingcheng, Heshun County, in Heshun County, Shanxi

See also
Qincheng (disambiguation)